Saku Ylätupa (born 4 August 1999) is a Finnish footballer who plays for Swedish club Kalmar FF. A pacy two-footed Finland international, he prefers to play as an attacking midfielder, but he can also play as a central midfielder, winger or centre-forward.

Club career

Early career
Born in Espoo in 1999, Ylätupa started his football career with HJK youth team. Ylätupa played in Klubi-04, the reserve team of HJK.

HJK
In 2016, Ylätupa was called up for HJK first team. On 2 April 2016, Ylätupa made his senior debut in Finnish League Cup against FC Lahti at Talin jalkapallohalli, playing the game as a starting line-up during 46 minutes.

Ajax
On 21 July 2017, it was announced that the midfielder had signed a three year contract with Dutch side AFC Ajax.

GIF Sundsvall
On 10 January 2022, Ylätupa signed a three-year contract with GIF Sundsvall.

Kalmar FF 
Following Sundsvall's relegation to the Superettan, on 16 January 2023 Ylätupa officially joined fellow Swedish side Kalmar FF for an undisclosed fee, signing a three-year contract with the club.

International
He made his debut for the Finland national football team on 8 January 2019 in a friendly against Sweden, as a 68th-minute substitute for Lassi Lappalainen.

Career statistics

Club

References

External links

Living people
1999 births
Finnish footballers
Finnish expatriate footballers
Association football midfielders
Finland youth international footballers
Finland under-21 international footballers
Finland international footballers
Helsingin Jalkapalloklubi players
FC Espoo players
AFC Ajax players
Jong Ajax players
Rovaniemen Palloseura players
Klubi 04 players
AIK Fotboll players
IFK Mariehamn players
GIF Sundsvall players
Eerste Divisie players
Veikkausliiga players
Allsvenskan players
Footballers from Espoo
Finnish expatriate sportspeople in the Netherlands
Finnish expatriate sportspeople in Sweden
Expatriate footballers in the Netherlands
Expatriate footballers in Sweden